A drag race is contest in the sport of drag racing.

Drag race or drag racer may also refer to:

 Drag boat racing, a form of drag racing which takes place on water rather than land
 Drag Race (album), a remix album of RuPaul's album Champion
 Drag Race (franchise)
 RuPaul's Drag Race, an American reality television series about drag queens 
 "Drag Racer" (song), a 1976 instrumental song by the Doug Wood Band
 Drag Racer (video game), a 2003 flash game developed by Phantom Games
High Heel Drag Queen Race, a drag queen race

See also 
 Drag Race Eliminator, a 1986 computer game